"Adrenaline" is the fifth single from American rock band Shinedown's fourth studio album, Amaryllis.

Release
The song was released on August 13, 2013. The official video premiered on the band's YouTube channel on October 30, 2013.

Track listing

Use in media
The song was the official theme song of WWE Extreme Rules 2012. It is also the official theme song of the monster truck Extreme Attitude.

Charts

References

2013 singles
2012 songs
Shinedown songs
Songs written by Brent Smith
Songs written by Dave Bassett (songwriter)
Song recordings produced by Rob Cavallo
Atlantic Records singles